Andrew Thorburn (born 13 April 1965) is an Australian-based businessman. Andrew Thorburn is a former CEO of Bank of NZ (BNZ), and also of National Australia Bank (NAB).

Early life 
Thorburn was born in Melbourne and is a dual Australian–New Zealand citizen. His mother is a New Zealander.

Banking career 
Thorburn joined ASB Bank in Auckland, New Zealand, in 1986. He moved to Sydney to join the Commonwealth Bank of Australia in 1997, and he then joined St George Bank in 2002. He moved to NAB in January 2005 as Head of Retail Banking. In 2008, he was appointed to be CEO of BNZ, and in 2014 the CEO of NAB.

At NAB, he moved to divest of non-core assets and focus on Australian and New Zealand interests. He launched a transformation of NAB in 2017 involving greater investment in technology, a reduction in costs, and an investment in business banking.

The period overlapped with the Royal Commission into Misconduct in the Banking and Superannuation industry. Thorburn resigned from NAB in February 2019 after the final report of the Royal Commission. At the time, he said, “As CEO I understand accountability. I have always sought to act in the best interests of the bank and customers and I know that I have always acted with integrity. However, I recognise there is a desire for change”. Some sources indicated Thornburn did not resign voluntarily but rather was pressured by the NAB board.

Beyond Banking 
As of February 2020, Thorburn was “exploring a number of areas of potential future involvement, including supporting entrepreneurs, venture capital and impact investing, and enabling purpose drive companies with growth ambitions”. Thorburn took up a role as executive director at For Purpose Investment Partners, a social impact funds manager in 2020. In April 2021, it was announced that he was working at Impact Investment Group in a part-time executive capacity for a few months, but also that he was the Chair of Catalyst Education (acquired by For Purpose), and was also confirmed as a senior advisor at BCG, and is the Board Chair at ATMOS Financial, a U.S. climate fintech startup.

Essendon Football Club
In October 2022, announcement of Thorburn's appointment as CEO of Essendon Football Club was widely criticised by the media and Essendon supporters due to the fact he served on the board of City on a Hill, an Anglican church where at least some messages appeared to be critical of homosexuality and comparing abortion to murder and the Holocaust. Thorburn distanced himself from the church despite still being on its board at the time of his acceptance of the Essendon CEO role. 
Thorburn's role at the church led him to resign the day after his appointment announcement was made public, and nearly a month before he was due to begin as Essendon FC CEO in November.  The reason cited by the Club was "a clear conflict of interest with an organisation whose views do not align at all with our values as a safe, inclusive, diverse and welcoming club for our staff, our players, our members, our fans, our partners and the wider community."

Thorburn was supported by Victorian Liberal Opposition Leader Matthew Guy; Liberal Opposition Leader Peter Dutton; the Catholic archbishop of Melbourne, Peter Comensoli; the Islamic Council of Victoria; and many other faith leaders.

Education 
Thorburn holds a Bachelor of Commerce (Economics) from the University of Auckland, and an MBA from the University of Durham, UK. He is a Fellow of the Australasian Institute of Banking and Finance.

Personal 
Thorburn has been married to his wife Kathryn (also a New Zealander) since 1987, and they have three adult children.

References

Australian bankers
Living people
1965 births
Alumni of Durham University